The women's snowboard halfpipe competition of the FIS Freestyle Ski and Snowboarding World Championships 2015 was held at Kreischberg, Austria on January 15 (qualifying)  and January 16 (finals). 
30 athletes from 14 countries competed.

Qualification
The following are the results of the qualification.

Elimination round
The following are the results of the elimination round.

Quarterfinals

The top 16 qualifiers advanced to the semifinals. From here, they participated in four-person elimination races, with the top two from each race advancing.

Heat 1

Heat 2

Heat 3

Heat 4

Semifinals

Heat 1

Heat 2

Finals

Small Finals

Big Finals

References

FIS Freestyle Ski and Snowboarding World Championships 2015